António Gedeão (b. Rómulo Vasco da Gama Carvalho, GCSE, GOIP; 24 November 1906 – 19 February 1997) was a Portuguese poet, essayist, writer and playwright, who also published several works related to science. António Gedeão was an alter ego of Rómulo de Carvalho, who, using his real name was also a professor, teaching chemistry and history of science.

Bibliography

Poetry
1956 - Movimento Perpétuo
1958 - Teatro do Mundo
1959 - Declaração de Amor
1961 - Máquina de Fogo
1964 - Poesias Completas
1967 - Linhas de Força
1980 - Soneto
1982 - Poema para Galileu
1984 - Poemas Póstumos
1985 - Poemas dos textos
1990 - Novos Poemas Póstumos

Fiction
1942 - Bárbara Ruiva (1ª edição: Abril 2009)

1973 - A poltrona e outras novelas

1969 - O Boda

Theatre
1978 - RTX 78/24
1981 - História Breve da Lua

Essays
1965 - O Sentimento Científico em Bocage
1975 - Ay Flores, Ay flores do verde pino

Scientific works

Pedagogic
1950 - Regras de notação e nomenclatura química
1952 - Considerações sobre o ensino elementar da Física
1953 - Compêndio de Química para o 3º Ciclo
1957 - Experiências escolares sobre tensão superficial dos líquidos e sobre lâminas da solução de sabão
1957 - Guias de trabalhos práticos de Química
1959 - Acerca do número de imagens dadas pelos espelhos planos inclinados entre si
1959 - A física como objecto de ensino
1959 - Problemas de Física para o 3º Ciclo do Ensino Liceal, I volume
1961 - Considerações sobre o princípio de Arquimedes
1962 - Novas maneiras de trabalhar com os tubos de Torricelli
1962 - Novo sistema de unidades físicas
1963 - Novo dispositivo para o estudo experimental das leis de reflexão da luz
1963 - Sobre os compêndios universitários exigidos pela Reforma Pombalina
1964 - O ensino elementar da Cinemática por meio de gráficos
1964 - Teoria e prática da ponte de Wheatstone
1965 - La formation du professeur de physique
1974 - Ciências da Natureza
1986 - História do ensino em Portugal

1906 births
1997 deaths
People from Lisbon
20th-century Portuguese poets
Portuguese male poets
Portuguese essayists
University of Porto alumni
20th-century Portuguese dramatists and playwrights
Portuguese male dramatists and playwrights
Male essayists
20th-century essayists
20th-century Portuguese male writers
20th-century pseudonymous writers